SSV Bozen Loacker is a men's handball club from Bolzano, Italy, that plays in the Serie A.

Titles 

Serie A :
 Winners (5) : 2011–12, 2012–13, 2014–15, 2016–17, 2018–19

Italian Cup :
 Winners (5) : 2011–12, 2012–13, 2014–15, 2018–19, 2019–20

Italian Super Cup :
 Winners (4) : 2012, 2015, 2017, 2019

European history

Team

2022–23 squad 
Squad for the 2022–23 season 

Goalkeepers
1  Pedro Henrique Hermones Silva
16  Raphael Rottensteiner

Wingers
RW 
13  Francisco Ahumada

LW 
15  Jonas Rossignoli
24  Tim Topolovec

Line players 
29  Andrea Bašić
34  Zoe Mizzoni
41  Francesco Scianamè

Back players
LB
7  Jonas Walcher
23  Dean Turković

CB 
24  Erik Udovičić
99  Marko Pandžić

RB
5  Marco Fantinato
19  Luiz Felipe Gaeta

External links
Official website

References

SSV Bozen Loacker
Sport in Bolzano